The Randolph County School System (RCSS) is a school district headquartered in Asheboro, North Carolina, United States. It serves Randolph County, except for the City of Asheboro, which is served by Asheboro City Schools.

History

In 2013 the district board voted 5-2 to ban Invisible Man from the school libraries. Gary Mason, a board member, said that he "didn’t find any literary value." The board vote occurred after a parent of an 11th grade student at Randleman High School complained about the book. After immediate outrage from residents and negative national coverage, the board voted 6-1 to reverse the decision within two weeks.

Schools

High schools

Zoned
 Eastern Randolph High School (Ramseur)
 Providence Grove High School (Climax)
 Randleman High School  (Randleman)
 Southwestern Randolph High School (Asheboro) (Unincorporated area)
 Trinity High School (Trinity)
 Wheatmore High School (Trinity, North Carolina)
Other
 Randolph Early College High School (Asheboro)

Middle schools
Trinity Middle School
Wheatmore Middle School
Northeastern Randolph Middle School
Randleman Middle School
Southeastern Randolph Middle School
Southwestern Randolph Middle School
Uwharrie Middle School

Elementary schools
Archdale Elementary School
Coleridge Elementary School
Farmer Elementary School
Franklinville Elementary School
Grays Chapel Elementary School
Hopewell Elementary School
John Lawrence Elementary School
Level Cross Elementary School
Liberty Elementary School
New Market Elementary School
Ramseur Elementary School
Randleman Elementary School
Seagrove Elementary School
Southmont Elementary School
Tabernacle Elementary School
Trindale Elementary School
Trinity Elementary School

References

External links

 Randolph County Public School System

Randolph County, North Carolina
School districts in North Carolina